Lun is a village in Lika-Senj County, Croatia, and the northernmost village of the Adriatic island of Pag. In the 2001 census, the village had a population of 337.

Lun is accessible from Novalja by automobile via the main road or from Rab via the Lun-Rab Passenger Ferry.
Main village of Lun is situated about half a mile up the hill from the coast. Its port area is named Tovarnele.

Predominant occupation of its inhabitants in the summer months is keeping bed and breakfasts and restaurants for seasonal tourists. Additional family support is provided by fishing, and farming sheep, grapes and olives.

Lun is known for its extensive olive garden, which contains thousands of ancient olive trees, including one that is claimed to be 2000 years old and another that is claimed to be 1600 years old. The garden also includes one of the world's largest collections of wild olive trees.

References

External links 

 

Populated places in Lika-Senj County
Pag (island)